Toyaguda, formerly called Kora, is a small village in Bela tehsil, Adilabad district, Telangana state, India. It is located about 330 km north of Hyderabad, 24 km east of Adilabad, and 15 km southwest of Bela, and 1 km west of the Sathnala Dam Reservoir.

According to the 2011 census, the town had 268 households and 1296 inhabitants (including 113 children 0-6), with an adult literacy rate of 66%.

References

Villages in Adilabad district